The Yıldız Hamidiye Mosque, also called the Yıldız Mosque, is an Ottoman imperial mosque located in Yıldız neighbourhood of Beşiktaş district in Istanbul, Turkey, on the way to Yıldız Palace. The mosque was commissioned by the Ottoman sultan Abdul Hamid II, and constructed between 1884 and 1886. The mosque was built on a rectangular plan and has one minaret. The architecture of the mosque is a combination of Neo-Gothic style and classical Ottoman motifs. A bronze colonnade erected by Abdul Hamid II in Marjeh Square of Damascus, Syria bears a replica statue of the Yıldız Mosque on top.

On 4 August 2017, the mosque was reopened by President Recep Tayyip Erdogan after 4 years of restoration work that cost 27 million Turkish liras ($7.6 million).

Assassination attempt of Abdul Hamid II 

On 21 July 1905, members of the Armenian Revolutionary Federation attempted to assassinate Abdul Hamid II by placing a horse carriage bomb in front of the mosque, an event known as the Yıldız assassination attempt. Although the bomb failed to kill the sultan due to an unforeseen delay, it killed 26 others and wounded 58 more. The attempt was in response to the pogroms and massacres against Armenians and other minorities of the Ottoman Empire carried out by Abdul Hamid II's government, the Hamidian massacres.

See also
 Yıldız assassination attempt
 Yıldız Palace
 Yıldız Clock Tower
 List of mosques
 Ottoman architecture

References

External links

 Images of the Yıldız Hamidiye Mosque

Mosques completed in 1886
Ottoman mosques in Istanbul
Sarkis Balyan buildings
Hamidiye
Gothic Revival architecture in Turkey
Beşiktaş
19th-century religious buildings and structures in Turkey